The William Alfred Moore House is a historic home located at Mount Airy, Surry County, North Carolina.  It was built between 1861 and 1863, and is the earliest known structure still standing in Mount Airy. The house is known for its Italianate and Gothic Revival exterior details and Greek Revival interior. In the front yard stands a rare hexagonal gazebo (c. 1865) made of wood poles and intervening laurel root walls. The Moore house is owned by the Mount Airy Restoration Foundation.

It was added to the National Register of Historic Places in 1986.

References

External links
VisitNC.org

Houses on the National Register of Historic Places in North Carolina
Gothic Revival architecture in North Carolina
Greek Revival houses in North Carolina
Italianate architecture in North Carolina
Houses completed in 1863
Houses in Surry County, North Carolina
National Register of Historic Places in Surry County, North Carolina
Mount Airy, North Carolina